Hebrew is a language native to Israel.

Hebrew may also refer to:

Language 
 A form of the Hebrew language:
 Biblical Hebrew
 Modern Hebrew
 The Hebrew alphabet, used to write Hebrew and other Jewish languages
 Hebrew (Unicode block), a block of Hebrew characters in Unicode.

Moths 
 Hebrew moth, or Polygrammate hebraeicum
 Hebrew character, or Orthosia gothica
 Setaceous Hebrew character, or Xestia c-nigrum

Other uses 
 Hebrews, a term for the Israelites and Jews
 Epistle to the Hebrews, abbreviated as Hebrews, a book of the Bible
 He’Brew, a brand of beer
 Hebrew University of Jerusalem, in Israel
 Hebrew College, in Massachusetts, United States

See also 
 Semitic (disambiguation)

Language and nationality disambiguation pages